Anne-Maria Laukkanen (born 1966) is a Finnish researcher (1990–) and a permanent full professor (2001–) of speech technique and vocology at the University of Tampere.

She has supervised 12 doctoral dissertations and 23 master theses and is now supervising 7 doctoral dissertations. She is a peer reviewer in 23 international scientific journals.

Primary Research Interests: Voice quality in speech and singing, effects and bases of vocal exercises, effects and mechanisms of vocal loading, and applicability of various research methods in vocology.

Her textbook The Wonderful Human Voice: Fundamentals of Sound Use and Speech Technique, Evaluation, Measurement and Development has been used for university teaching in Finnish speech therapy and vocology since 1999.

Education 
Laukkanen studied at the University of Helsinki, where she obtained a Master of Arts in Phonetics in 1990, and 
a Licentiate in Phonetics in 1993. Laukkanen studied also at the University of Tampere, where she obtained Ph.D. in Phoniatrics in 1995.

Thesis publications 
  (Ph.D. Thesis) 
  (Phil. Lic. Thesis) 
  (M.A. Thesis)

Textbook

Publications 
 Leino, Timo & Laukkanen, Anne-Maria & Vojtech, Radolf:  Journal of Voice, March 2011;25:2:150–158. .
  Folia Phoniatrica et Logopaedica, August 2008;60:199–209. .
  Logopedics Phoniatrics Vocology, 2004;29:2:66–76. .
 Waaramaa, Teija & Laukkanen, Anne-Maria & Leino, Timo: Student actors' expression of emotions on prolonged vowels. PEVOC 5, Graz 28–31 August 2003, Austria.
 Laukkanen, Anne-Maria & Syrjä, Tiina & Leino, Timo:  PEVOC 4, Stockholm 23–26 August 2001, Sweden.
 Leino, Timo & Laukkanen, Anne-Maria & Välikoski, Tuula-Riitta (eds.):  (Three decades of speech technique and vocology at the University of Tampere). Vokologiaa, puheviestintää ja muuta puheentutkimusta – Juhlakirja Timo Leinolle (Vocology, Speech Communication and Other Speech Research Anniversary Book for Timo Leino). Department of Speech Technique, University of Tampere, Finland, 125 pages. 2001. .
 Leino, Timo & Laukkanen, Anne-Maria & Kättö, Riitta & Ilomäki, Irma:  Proceedings of the 24th World Congress of the International Association of Logopedics and Phoniatrics – Communication and its disorders a science in progress. IALP August 23–27, 1998, Amsterdam, Nijmegen University Press. The Netherlands. Pages 60–62. .
 Leino, Timo & Laukkanen, Anne-Maria:  (Effect of recording distance on average speech spectrum). Fonetiikan päivät – Helsinki 1992, Papers from the 17th Meeting of Finnish Phoneticians, (Antti Iivonen, Reijo Aulanko, eds.) Publications of the Department of Phonetics, University of Helsinki, Finland, 36. pp. 117–130, 1993.

References

External links 
 
 
 
 
 

1966 births
Academic staff of the University of Tampere
Speech and language pathologists
Living people
University of Tampere alumni
University of Helsinki alumni
Finnish women academics